Neocandona is a genus of ostracods belonging to the family Candonidae.

Species:

Neocandona helunga 
Neocandona wangshiehi 
Neocandona wanwuia 
Neocandona yufuiia

References

Ostracods